This is list of Eastern Catholic seminaries in the world. They prepare candidates for the priesthood.

Alexandrian liturgical tradition

Egypt 
(Coptic) St. Leo’s Patriarchal Seminary in Maadi (1953), a suburb of Cairo

Eritrea 
(Eritrean) Seminary in Asmara, Eritrea
(Eritrean) Seminary in Keren, Eritrea

Ethiopia 
(Ethiopian) Capuchin Franciscan Institute of Philosophy and Theology in Addis Ababa, Ethiopia
(Ethiopian) Seminary in Adigrat, Ethiopia

Italy
(Ethiopian) Pontifical Ethiopian College in Rome

Antiochian (Antiochene or West-Syriac) liturgical tradition

Italy 
 (Maronite)Collegio dei Maroniti (1584, reopened in 2000) in Rome

Lebanon 
 (Maronite) Seminary of St. Antoine in Lebanon
 (Maronite) Maronite Patriarchal Seminary at Ghazir
The Holy Spirit University of Kaslik , Lebanon provides advanced theological education for Maronite
(Syriac) Al-Charfet Patriarchal Seminary  in Lebanon

India
(Syro-Malankara) St. Mary’s Malankara Major Seminary (1983) at Trivandrum

North Lebanon 
 (Maronite) diocesan seminary at Karm Sadde, near Tripoli

United States 
 (Maronite) Our Lady of Lebanon Seminary in Washington, D.C.

Armenian liturgical tradition

Armenia
 Holy Archangels Junior Seminary, Gyumri

Italy 
Collegio Armeno in Rome

Lebanon 
 Bzoummar Seminary in Bzoummar
 Mechitarist Fathers Seminary in Bikfaya

Chaldean or East Syriac liturgical tradition

India
 Malpan Seminary with University status in Kottapuram/ Pallipuram Established by Patriarch of Church of The East in AD 450 for Malabar, later seminary was shifted to Mananam and dissolved in St.Joseph's Seminary of Syro - Malabar Church CMI fathers
 Syro-Malabar St. Joseph's Pontifical Seminary (Mangalapuzha Seminary) in Mangalapuzha, Aluva
 Syro-Malabar St. Thomas Apostolic Seminary in Vadavathoor
 Syro-Malabar Good Shepherd Major Seminary  in Kunnoth, Tellicherry
 Syro-Malabar St. Ephrem Major Seminary for Missions, Satna
 Syro-Malabar Mary Matha Major Seminary, Thrissur

Iraq
 (Chaldean) St. Peter Seminary for Chaldean Patriarchate in Iraq. http://chaldeanseminary.com/

United States
 (Chaldean) The Seminary of Mar Abba the Great in San Diego

Byzantine (Constantinopolitan) liturgical tradition

Brazil 
 (Ukrainian) Greek Catholic Seminary in Curitiba

Canada 
 (Ukrainian) Holy Spirit Seminary of Ukrainian Greek Catholic Church, Edmonton, Alberta
 (Ukrainian) Metropolitan Andrey Sheptytsky Institute of Eastern Christian Studies of St. Michael's College, Toronto, Ontario

Croatia 
 Greek Catholic Seminary in Zagreb (1681)

Germany 
 Collegium Orientale in Eichstätt

Hungary 
   Saint Athanasius Greek Catholic College of Theology and Seminary in Nyíregyháza

Palestine
 (Melkite) St. Anne’s Seminary in Jerusalem, under the direction of the White Fathers (Missionaries of Africa), closed
 (Melkite) Holy Savior Seminary in Beit Sahour, Palestine, for dioceses in Israel, Jordan, and Palestine

Italy 
 Ukrainian Pontifical College of Saint Josaphat (1897)
 Pontifical Ukrainian College of the Protection of our Lady in Rome (closed)
 Pontifical Greek College of Saint Athanasius (Pontificio Collegio Greco) in Rome
 Collegium Russicum  (Pontificio Collegio Russo) (1929) in Rome
 Pontifical Romanian College (“Pio Romeno”) in Rome
 Pontifical Oriental Institute, Rome

Lebanon 
 (Melkite) Patriarchal Seminary of St. Anne in Raboueh, Antelias, Lebanon

Romania 
 Greek Catholic Theological Faculty at the Babeș-Bolyai University in Cluj-Napoca

Slovakia 
 (Slovak) Byzantine Catholic Seminary of Pavol Peter Gojdič in Prešov

United States 
 (Ruthenian) Byzantine Catholic Seminary of SS. Cyril and Methodius of (Ruthenian) Byzantine Catholic Church Pittsburgh, PA
 (Ukrainian) St. Basil College Seminary, of Ukrainian Catholic Eparchy of Stamford
 (Ukrainian) Saint Josaphat Seminary, Washington, DC

Ukraine 
 Ukrainian Catholic University in Lviv
 Holy Spirit Seminary of Ukrainian Greek Catholic Church, Lviv
 Greek Catholic Seminary in Uzhhorod (1995)
 Seminary of Blessed Martyrs Severyn, Yakym and Vitalij of Ukrainian Greek Catholic Church, in Drohobych
 Ivano-Frankivsk Theological Academy of Greek-Catholic Church
 Greek Catholic Seminary in Ternopil
 Kyiv Theological Seminary of the Three Holy Hierarchs

See also
List of Catholic seminaries

References

External links
 Syro-Malankara Seminaries and Institutions
 Syro-Malabar Seminaries
Pontifical Oriental Institute

seminaries
Lists of Catholic universities and colleges